The Canadian Screen Award for Best Costume Design is awarded by the Academy of Canadian Cinema and Television to the best Canadian costume designer. It was formerly called the Genie Award for Best Achievement in Costume Design before the Genies were merged into the Canadian Screen Awards.

1980s

1990s

2000s

2010s

2020s

See also
Prix Iris for Best Costume Design

References

 
Costume design
Costume design awards